P69 may refer to:

 Ford P69, an aborted racing car prototype
 , a submarine of the Royal Navy
 , a corvette of the Indian Navy
 Papyrus 69, a biblical manuscript
 Republic XP-69, a canceled American fighter aircraft proposal
 P69, a state regional road in Latvia